The Chimala Mission Hospital is a Christian hospital located in Chimala, Mbarali District, Mbeya Region, Tanzania. The hospital has a monthly average of 750 in-patients, 750 monthly outpatients and 6,000 yearly patients in the HIV clinics. The hospital was founded in 1962.

History
As Tanzania came out from under European rule in the 1960s, the Tanzanian government wished to remove any foreign influence from the country. The Chimala Mission was asked to leave the country, unless they could prove they were benefiting the people of Tanzania. So the administration of the Mission decided to construct a hospital. It began as a one-room metal-building that served as a clinic. Over the years, the hospital grew to be a 128-bed hospital that offers a number of services to the people of southern Tanzania.

Services
The primary diagnoses treated are HIV/AIDS or related complications, TB, malaria, diarrheal diseases, and parasites.

Services offered include:
Children's Ward
Male Ward
Female Ward
OB/Labor and Delivery Ward
Basic Surgical Services
HIV Care
Outpatient care
X-ray services
Laboratory services (hematocrit, blood typing, HIV testing, etc.)

Employees
The hospital employs 3 medical officers, 3 clinical officers, and numerous nurses. Volunteer nurses, doctors, and students travel to Chimala each summer. Many of these volunteers are affiliated with Harding University.

Quality of care

The staff at Chimala Mission Hospital are trying to increase the quality of care.  Their vision is to be "Spirit-lead, patient-centered, and staff-friendly." Currently, hospital standards of care are being developed in hopes of greatly increasing the quality of care provided. It is their hope that God will be glorified by their quality service to others.

References

External links

Hospitals in Tanzania
Hospitals established in 1962
Buildings and structures in the Mbeya Region
Christian hospitals
1962 establishments in Tanzania